The Municipal Conservatory of Sestao or the Municipal Conservatory of Music of Sestao is a teaching institution, which is devoted to music education. The present ownership belongs to the Sestao City Hall.

It was founded in 1912–1914, by the Municipal Music Band of Sestao as a music school in order to equip itself with new musicians who would become part of the municipal band (for this reason it was later given the name of the director of the Municipal Band, Mr. Victor Miranda Zuazua).

Its original name is "Municipal Conservatory of Sestao" and that was its official name until the beginning of the 21st century (2000-2002).

The most famous student of the Municipal Conservatory of Sestao is Spanish-Italian violinist Felix Ayo.

History 

In 1890, the City Council of Sestao ordered the municipal architect, Casto de Zabala, to draw up a general plan of the municipality, an urban arrangement. Zabala drew an extension in which the main artery would be "Avenida de Sestao", which was finally inaugurated as "Gran Vía de La Vizcaya" and after the Spanish Civil War as "Gran Vía de Carlos VII" (today " Gran Vía José Antonio Agirre").

In 1912 the architect Santos Zunzunegui built the current building and in 1914 the Carlos VII Municipal School was inaugurated, which housed the building, a building with a classical tendency. The building was remodeled in 1987.

The building was remodeled and renovated again in 2010, acquiring its current façade.

Originally and until approximately the year 2000, the school was called "Municipal Conservatory of Sestao", but the legal reform of 1992-1998 changed the name from "Conservatory" to "School of Music".

Currently the School bears the name of Víctor Miranda Zuazua, director of the Municipal Music Band of Sestao at the beginning of the 20th century.

The conservatory 

The School of Music is a teaching institution dedicated to musical education. It offers training in classical music and classical dance (ballet). The School offers training in music and dance from the age of 4. It offers training in music, musical language, music theory, singing, choir, instruments (accordion, violin, clarinet, piano...), ballet...

The school building houses two auditoriums, one main and one secondary. They represent musical works of the school, plays or exhibit works of art and exhibitions.

Principal 

 Elena Bárcena (-2020)
 Natalia Goñi (2020-)

Academic staff 

 Elena Bárcena, pianist
 Blanca Gallastegui, pianist
 Natalia Goñi, accordionist

Notable alumni 

 Felix Ayo, violinist
 Rosa Lavín, pianist
 Julen Murga, accordionist

References 

Music schools in Spain